ReMastered: Tricky Dick & the Man in Black is a 2018 documentary film about how President Richard Nixon, out of concern for the influence of rock-n-roll to the voters, invited Johnny Cash to the White House seeking the country music star's approval.

Premise
ReMastered: Tricky Dick & the Man in Black is about the relationship between Johnny Cash and Richard Nixon and Cash's historic performance at the White House on April 17, 1970.  During the visit, it becomes apparent that Cash's emerging ideals clashed with Richard Nixon's policies.

Cast
 Johnny Cash
 Richard Nixon
 Aram Bakshian
 Pat Buchanan
 Alexander Butterfield
 John Carter Cash
 W.S. Holland
 Bill Miller
 Don Reid
 Lou Robin
 Jimmie Snow
 Mark Stielper
 Joanne Cash Yates
 Bill Zimmerman
 Bill Anderson

Songs
The documentary includes the song "What Is Truth?"

References

External links

 
 
 

2018 documentary films
2018 films
Netflix original documentary films
2010s English-language films